The Kirsanov reaction is a method for the synthesis of certain organophosphorus compounds.  In this reaction a tertiary phosphine is combined with a halogen and then an amine to give the iminophosphines, which are useful ligands and useful reagents.
A typical reaction involves triphenylphosphine with bromine to give bromotriphenylphosphonium bromide:
Ph3P + Br2 → Ph3PBr+Br−

This salt is treated in situ with alkylamines to give the iminophosphorane:
Ph3PBr+Br− + 3 RNH2 → Ph3PNR + 2 RNH3+Br−

The method is used when the conventional Staudinger reaction is not applicable, i.e. when the organic azide is not available to generate the iminophosphorane. Thus, it is used to make iminophosphoranes from alkyl amines.

References

Name reactions